The 2014 season will be the 35th season of competitive association football in Malaysia.

Promotion and relegation

Pre-season

New teams 

 Kuantan FA (FAM League)
 Tumpat FA (FAM League)
 Cebagoo FC (FAM League)
 Harimau Muda C (FAM League)
 PB Melayu Kedah (FAM League)
 Perak YBU FC (FAM League)

National team

Malaysia national football team

League season

Super league

Premier league

FAM League

Domestic Cups

Community Shield

FA Cup

Final

Malaysia Cup

Final